Stephen John Thornber (born 11 October 1965) is an English former professional footballer and current youth team manager of Bradford City.

Thornber, a midfielder, began his career as a junior with Halifax Town in 1983. He remained with the Shaymen for five years, making 104 league appearances and scoring four goals.

In 1988, he moved to Swansea City in a £10,000 deal. In three years at the Welsh club he made 117 appearances, scoring six goals.

His next move, in 1992, was to Blackpool, then managed by Billy Ayre, a former teammate and manager of Thornber during his time at Halifax. After a year and just under a quarter-century of appearances at Bloomfield Road, he joined Scunthorpe United on a free transfer.

References
Thornber's profile at Soccerbase

1965 births
Living people
Association football midfielders
Blackpool F.C. players
Bradford (Park Avenue) A.F.C. players
Bradford City A.F.C. non-playing staff
English Football League players
English footballers
Footballers from Dewsbury
Halifax Town A.F.C. players
Rotherham United F.C. non-playing staff
Scunthorpe United F.C. non-playing staff
Scunthorpe United F.C. players
Swansea City A.F.C. players